The Romance of a Poor Sinner is a 1922 German silent film directed by Richard Eichberg and starring Lee Parry, Aruth Wartan and Eduard Rothauser.

The film's sets were designed by the art director Jacek Rotmil.

Cast
 Lee Parry
 Aruth Wartan
 Eduard Rothauser
 Max Wogritsch
 Walter Steinbeck
 Gerhard Ritterband
 Gustav Birkholz
 Syme Delmar
 Rudolf Klein-Rhoden
 Josef Commer
 Paul Ludwig

References

Bibliography
 Bock, Hans-Michael & Bergfelder, Tim. The Concise CineGraph. Encyclopedia of German Cinema. Berghahn Books, 2009.

External links

1922 films
Films of the Weimar Republic
German silent feature films
Films directed by Richard Eichberg
German black-and-white films
1920s German films